Cinematic is the sixth studio album by Owl City. It was released independently via Sky Harbor on June 1, 2018. The album debuted at number 115 on the Billboard 200. Upon the albums release, Young released three "reels" EPs that would include some songs on the album.

Background and composition 
Following the 2015 Owl City album Mobile Orchestra, Adam Young announced that he would suspend work on Owl City to undertake a project of instrumental scores; he released one score, or album, each month in 2016 except January. Also in 2016, he released a Christmas single named "Humbug," which was released for free download and independently.

Young hinted after the conclusion of the Scores project that work on Owl City had resumed and a new album was in progress; this was revealed, on October 30, 2017, to be Cinematic. Young distinguished Cinematic from existing Owl City releases by stating that its content would center around events from his life rather than ethereal concepts (he clarified after the album's release that all prior Owl City work "was pure imagination," and Cinematic was "the first album [to] hold songs written from a personal perspective"). Album artwork and release date were revealed concurrently with the name, followed shortly by a track listing. The album has 18 tracks in total, with 15 main songs and 3 alternate recordings.

The album has a more personal and autobiographical theme to it. Young had written songs about his hometown, family and his personal experiences. Musically, the album contains pop, ballads, rock and electronic sounds.

Release 
Young elected to precipitate Cinematic's release with three successive "reels," each containing three songs from the full album. Early releases included the album's lead single "All My Friends," which was released on November 3, 2017 and would go on to comprise part of Reel 1, and "Not All Heroes Wear Capes," which was released on June 15, 2017 dedicated for Father's Day of that year and would go on to comprise part of Reel 2.

Reel 1 was released on December 1, 2017 and, in addition to "All My Friends," included "Fiji Water" and "The 5th of July."

"Lucid Dream," intended as the lead single for Reel 2, was released on January 12, 2018. The reel itself was released on February 2, including, in addition to "Lucid Dream," "Montana" and a new electric version of "Not All Heroes Wear Capes." The acoustic Father's Day recording would not go on to be part of the final Cinematic album alongside its electric cousin, nor would an acoustic version of "Montana" that was released shortly after Reel 2 (which differs from the album's alternative version of the same song).

The lead single for Reel 3, "New York City," was released on March 9, 2018, with the reel following on April 6. In addition to "New York City," it included "Cloud Nine" and "Be Brave."

The album was released in full on June 1, 2018, including a total of 15 original songs, in addition to 3 "alternative versions" of selected songs.

Music videos were recorded for each of the three lead singles and released concurrently. Each video features the same characters and is loosely connected to the others; a "director's cut" of all three was released shortly after the standalone version of the third.

Cinematic and its preceding reels were released on Sky Harbor Records, an independent label owned by Young, confirming the end of Owl City's affiliation with Universal Republic. (All albums from the Scores project had been released on Sky Harbor, but under Young's own name, not as Owl City.) In addition to Cinematic, Sky Harbor retains the copyright to Owl City's first two studio works, Of June and Maybe I'm Dreaming, as well as An Airplane Carried Me to Bed, an album of Young's pre-Owl City work that Universal Republic published.

Cinematic was not released on CD until August 15th, 2022.

Promotion 
The Cinematic North American and Asian tours occurred respectively from September 13, 2018 to October 14, 2018 and from November 7, 2018 to November 24, 2018.

Critical reception 

Cinematic was generally received with mixed reviews. Matt Conner of CCM Magazine stated, "If you’re already a fan of Owl City's easygoing synthpop structures, you'll find lots to like here." Christopher Smith of Jesus Freak Hideout remarked, "Many tracks start and end without leaving a lasting impression, but nonetheless put you in a good mood due to the cheerful synth pop soundscapes and optimistic lyrics."

Track listing

Charts

Release history

References

External links 

2018 albums
Owl City albums
Electronica albums by American artists
Pop albums by American artists